Crnoljevica is a small village near the town Svrljig, in the Nišava District in eastern Serbia.

Populated places in Nišava District